Nicolás Cherro (born 24 April 1987) is an Argentine former professional footballer who played as a centre-back.

Career
Cherro's senior career began in 2005 with Ferro Carril Oeste, prior to joining Atlanta of Primera B Metropolitana in 2007. After four seasons, as he featured one hundred and forty-two times and scored fifteen goals, the club won promotion to Primera B Nacional for the 2011–12 campaign. They were immediately relegated, with Cherro departing after appearing for the final time against Gimnasia y Esgrima in April 2012. In the succeeding July, Cherro moved to Championnat National side Metz. He didn't appear in the league but played twice in the Coupe de France. He made eight appearances for the reserves in the French fourth tier.

Cherro returned to Argentina in 2013, subsequently having spells with Sportivo Desamparados and Tristán Suárez - though didn't feature competitively for either. 2016 saw Primera B Metropolitana's Fénix sign Cherro. He scored a brace on his debut, netting in a 5–1 victory over UAI Urquiza on 8 February 2016. He scored a further four goals in the following 2016–17 season. Cherro spent the 2017–18 Primera B Nacional with Villa Dálmine but appeared just twice, as a starter versus Independiente Rivadavia and off the bench against San Martín. In July 2018, Cherro rejoined Primera B Metropolitana's Atlanta.

Cherro retired from professional football on 11 July 2019, weeks after winning promotion with the club to Primera B Nacional.

Career statistics

Honours
Atlanta
Primera B Metropolitana: 2010–11

References

External links

1987 births
Living people
Footballers from Buenos Aires
Argentine people of Italian descent
Argentine footballers
Association football defenders
Argentine expatriate footballers
Expatriate footballers in France
Argentine expatriate sportspeople in France
Primera Nacional players
Primera B Metropolitana players
Championnat National 2 players
Ferro Carril Oeste footballers
Club Atlético Atlanta footballers
FC Metz players
Sportivo Desamparados footballers
CSyD Tristán Suárez footballers
Club Atlético Fénix players
Villa Dálmine footballers